Park Shin-hye (born February 18, 1990) is a South Korean actress and singer.

Film

Television series

Television show

Documentary

Hosting

Music video

References

South Korean filmographies